The 2007–08 Wisconsin Badgers men's basketball team represented University of Wisconsin–Madison. The head coach was Bo Ryan, coaching his seventh season with the Badgers. The team played its home games at the Kohl Center in Madison, Wisconsin, and is a member of the Big Ten Conference.  The team finished with a final record of 31–5 which set the school record for wins in a season.

Season Notes
This was the second of back-to-back 30+ win season for Wisconsin. Brian Butch and Michael Flowers were seniors; Marcus Landry and Joe Krabbenhoft were juniors; Trevon Hughes and Jason Bohannon were sophomores. All contributed to the team's success.

Wisconsin won the Big Ten regular season title outright, won the Big Ten tournament championship, and were only awarded a #3 seed. It apparently was a down year for the Big Ten as only four teams made the NCAA tournament.

Wisconsin handled #14 seed Cal State Fullerton 71-56 in the first round. Then had to be on "upset alert" for #11 seed cinderella Kansas St, who boasted stud freshman Michael Beasley. However, Wisconsin prevailed 72-55. In the Sweet Sixteen they ran into the true cinderella, #10 seed Davidson with Steph Curry, and lost 56-73. Trevon Hughes was hobbled with a bum ankle and only played 11 minutes in that game.

This was the year all #1 seeds made the Final Four, and Kansas beat Memphis in the championship.

Awards
All-Big Ten by Media
 Brian Butch - 1st team
 Michael Flowers - 2nd team
 Marcus Landry - 3rd team
 Trevon Hughes - Honorable mention

All-Big Ten by Coaches
 Brian Butch - 1st team
 Marcus Landry - 2nd team
 Michael Flowers - 3rd team & All-Defensive team
 Joe Krabbenhoft - All-Defensive team

Roster

Schedule

|-
!colspan=12| Regular Season

|-
!colspan=12| Big Ten tournament

|-
!colspan=12| NCAA tournament

References

Wisconsin Badgers men's basketball seasons
Wisconsin
Wisconsin
Badge
Badge